Muhammad Zaheer ud Din Khan Alizai is a Pakistani politician who was a Member of the Provincial Assembly of the Punjab, from May 2013 to May 2018 and from August 2018 to January 2023.

Early life and education
He was born on 21 September 1973 in Multan.

He received matriculation level education.

Political career

He was elected to the Provincial Assembly of the Punjab as a candidate of Pakistan Tehreek-e-Insaf (PTI) from Constituency PP-194 (Multan-I) in 2013 Pakistani general election.

He was re-elected to Provincial Assembly of the Punjab as a candidate of PTI from Constituency PP-214 (Multan-IV) in 2018 Pakistani general election.

References

Living people
Punjab MPAs 2013–2018
1973 births
Pakistan Tehreek-e-Insaf MPAs (Punjab)
Punjab MPAs 2018–2023